Depolymerizable polymers or Low-Ceiling Temperature Polymers refer to polymeric materials that can undergo depolymerization to revert the materials to their monomers at relatively low temperatures, such as room temperature. For example, the ceiling temperature Tc for formaldehyde is 119 °C, and that for acetaldehyde is -39 °C.

Introduction 
Unlike stable polymers such as PVCs that have high thermal stability, depolymerizable polymers and closely related self-immolative polymers can be triggered by stimuli to break fast under moderate to low temperatures. The first type of polymers, poly (olefin sulfone), was reported by Snow and Frey in 1943. It was further confirmed and explained in terms of the thermodynamics of a reversible propagation step by Dainton and Ivin. Closely related to depolymerizable polymers, self-immolative polymers can also irreversibly disassemble into their constituent parts in response to stimuli such as temperature, biological inputs or pH.

Applications 
The first application of depolymerizable polymers is in transient electronics. Over the past several decades in the electronics industry, polymer research has focused on developing and optimizing durable and high-strength polymeric materials for use in electronics. Demand for consumer electronics and the generation of electronic waste has also prompted research into employing depolymerization methods to generate more sustainable and recyclable polymers. For example, a group of researchers employed light-sensitive poly(phthalaldehyde) as substrate materials for circuits. The destruction of the polymer substrate was triggered by UV irradiation (~379 nm). Other applications include controlled release of small molecules, and as  stimuli-responsive photoresists for lithography.

References

Polymers